Dushinsky is one of the few Hasidic dynasties not named after the place where it originated; instead, it is named after the surname of the Rebbe. It is a relatively new dynasty, as are many of the dynasties that originated in Hungary. However, the Dushinsky dynasty truly became a dynasty in Jerusalem, where it is centered today. It is not like other Hasidic groups, in that it does not originate from a Hasidic background, but from the talmidim (students) of the Chasam Sofer.

Yosef Tzvi Dushinsky (1865-1948), the Maharitz

The founder of the Dushinsky dynasty was Rabbi Yosef Tzvi Dushinsky, son of Rabbi Yisroel Dushinsky. He was a disciple of Rabbi Simcha Bunim Sofer (Shevet Sofer), one of the grandchildren of the Chasam Sofer.

After his marriage to the daughter of Rabbi Mordechai Winkler, author of Levushei Mordechai, Rabbi Dushinsky became the chief rabbi in Galanta, Slovakia. In an epidemic during the First World War, his first wife died childless, and he subsequently remarried Esther Neuhaus, daughter of Rabbi Yoel Tzvi Neuhaus. He relocated to the town of Chust, where he assumed the position of chief rabbi. In 1921, his only child, Yisroel Moshe, was born. 

In 1932, Dushinsky and his son visited Mandatory Palestine. The chief rabbi and founder of the Edah HaChareidis, Rabbi Yosef Chaim Sonnenfeld, leader of the Haredi community of Jerusalem, died a few days later, and Dushinsky delivered one of the hespedim (eulogies) at the funeral. After his return to Chust, he was prevailed upon to succeed Sonnenfeld as Rav of Jerusalem. He and his family, together with 25 students, immigrated to Palestine on August 28, 1933. Dushinsky founded a community of Hungarian Jews in Jerusalem, affiliated with the Perushim section of the Edah HaChareidis.

Dushinsky was known for his strong opposition to Zionism, and spoke to the newly formed United Nations against the creation of the Zionist State. Rabbi Dushinsky died on the eve of Sukkos, 14th of Tishrei 1948, shortly after the founding of the State of Israel. He was succeeded by Rabbi Zelig Reuven Bengis.

Books written by him, or based on his work, include:
 Shut Maharitz (halachic responsa)
 Toras Maharitz (Chumash commentary)
 Chiddushei Maharitz (Gemara commentary)

Yisroel Moshe Dushinsky (1921-2003), the Maharim

Rabbi Yosef Tzvi's only son, Yisroel Moshe, inherited his father's position as Grand Rabbi of the Dushinsky community, and in turn also became the Chief Rabbi of the Edah HaChareidis. Under his leadership, the Dushinsky community was steered towards Hasidut. Rabbi Yisroel Moshe died in 2003; he was succeeded as Chief Rabbi of the Edah HaChareidis by Rabbi Yitzchok Tuvia Weiss and as Grand Rabbi of Dushinsky by his son, Rabbi Yosef Tzvi.

Dushinsky today

A famous student of Rabbi Yisroel Moshe, Rabbi Avrohom Yitzchok Ulman is one of the members of the Rabbinical Court (Badatz), which leads the Edah HaChareidis. He also leads his own beth din, and is highly respected in Dushinsky, where he is regarded as the second most important person after the Rebbe.

In 2005, a new large synagogue was inaugurated. It was built behind the old building on Shmuel HaNavi Street, and seats hundreds. The bochurim (unmarried young men) sit in a first-level balcony-like room, while only married men and their pre-bar mitzvah children sit in the main shul. Above the bochurim's balcony is another balcony for the women. The main synagogue is only used on Shabbos and holidays; on weekdays, a complex of four also brand-new smaller synagogues (shtiblach) in the basement of the building are used. The old synagogue, on the first floor of the old building, is now used for tishen.

Rebbe Yosef Tzvi Dushinsky, the present leader of the movement, has appointed his younger brother, Rabbi Mordechai Yehuda Dushinsky, as rabbi of the Dushinsky community in the all-Haredi Beit Shemesh neighbourhood of Ramat Beit Shemesh Bet. Aside from the Dushinsky communities in Jerusalem and Ramat Beit Shemesh, there are also smaller communities in Manchester, Elad, in New York's Boro Park district, and in London. In 2007, new Dushinsky synagogues were built in London and in the Williamsburg section of Brooklyn, New York, and building began for a new Talmud Torah in Ramat Beit Shemesh Bet, in addition to the recently completed synagogue there. There are also a number of Dushinsky Hasidim in Antwerp; however, there is no specific Dushinsky synagogue there.

Dushinsky minhagim
Dushinsky has several special minhagim (customs), in things such as the style of dress and the nusach used. The nusach used, called nusach Maharitz, is a mix of nusach Ashkenaz and nusach Sefard. This is not only the case with Shemoneh Esrei, but also with other elements of prayer: For example, between Kabbolos Shabbos and Maariv on Friday night, both Bameh Madlikin and Kegavno are said, and on Sukkos, the lulav is shaken both according to the nusach Ashkenaz and the nusach Sefard minhagim. At mincha (as opposed to Shacharit), Tachanun is recited with vidui, as per nusach Ashkenaz. However, Kaddish and Kedushoh are said according to nusach Sefard, and Boruch she'omar is said after Hodu.

Books held in high regard are the works of the Chasam Sofer, the book Shevet Sofer, and the collections of Torah commentaries by the previous rebbes: Toras Maharitz, and Toras Maharim. The study of mystical works is regarded as secondary to studying Halacha and Gemara.

Regarding Zionism, the book Vayoel Moshe, written by Rabbi Joel Teitelbaum of Satmar, is regarded as authoritative, and received a praising recommendation from both the previous Rebbe (the Maharim) and Rav Avrohom Yitzchok Ulman when a new edition was printed in 2002.

Lineage of the Dushinsky dynasty

References

Sources

External links
Rabbi Yoseph Tzvi Dushinsky on Zionism
Video of Purim Tish 5767 (2006)

Hasidic dynasties headquartered in Jerusalem
Hasidic anti-Zionism